Crime, Law and Social Change is a monthly peer-reviewed academic journal covering criminology from a global perspective, with a particular focus on "financial crime, corruption, terrorism and organizational crime". It was established in 1977 as Contemporary Crises, obtaining its current name in 1991. The editors-in-chief are Mary Dodge (University of Colorado Denver) and Willem Huisman (Vrije Universiteit Amsterdam). According to the Journal Citation Reports, the journal has a 2017 impact factor of 0.662.

References

External links

Springer Science+Business Media academic journals
Criminology journals
Sociology journals
Publications established in 1977
Monthly journals
English-language journals